Mirela Tenkov (born 12 March 1990) is a Serbian football striker currently playing in the Serbian First League for Spartak Subotica, with which she made her Champions League debut in August 2011. One month later she made her debut for the Serbian national team in a surprise draw against England.

References

1990 births
Living people
Serbian women's footballers
Serbia women's international footballers
Women's association football forwards
ŽFK Spartak Subotica players